The Roman Catholic Diocese of Wa is a diocese located in the city of Wa in the Ecclesiastical province of Tamale in Ghana.

History
 November 3, 1959: Established as the Diocese of Wa from the Diocese of Tamale

Special churches
The Cathedral is St. Andrew’s Cathedral in Wa.
St Cecilia's  Parish At Wa Sombo
Our Lady Fatima At Wapaani
St Benedict At Konta/School For The Deaf

Leadership
 Bishops of Wa 
 Bishop Peter Poreku Dery (1960.03.16 – 1974.11.18), appointed Bishop of Tamale; future Archbishop and Cardinal
 Bishop Gregory Eebolawola Kpiebaya (1974.11.18 – 1994.03.26), appointed Archbishop of Tamale
 Bishop Paul Bemile (1994.12.19 - 2016.02.17)
 Bishop Richard Baawobr (2016.02.17 - 2022.11.27), made a cardinal in August 2022

See also
Roman Catholicism in Ghana

Sources
 GCatholic.org
 Catholic Hierarchy

Wa
Wa
Christian organizations established in 1959
Roman Catholic dioceses and prelatures established in the 20th century
1959 establishments in Ghana
Roman Catholic Ecclesiastical Province of Tamale